Landestheater Coburg (Coburg State Theatre) is a medium-sized three-division (opera / operetta, drama, ballet) theatre in Coburg, Bavaria, Germany. In 2008, the theatre employed 250 permanent staff and 100 part-time employees.

History
Like in many other princely residence towns, the roots of Coburg's theatre lie with the local ruling family. In the 16th century, amateur plays were staged in honour of the ducal family, mostly by students at the Casimirianum. In 1764, Duke Ernst Friedrich established another theatre, in the former Ballhaus (today the location of the ), but no continuous stage work ensued. Only in 1827, when Duke Ernst I founded the Herzoglich-Sächsisches Hoftheater (ducal Saxon court theatre) was a permanent theatrical ensemble hired. The location was still the Ballhaus which soon turned out to be insufficient. Thus a new building was erected on Schlossplatz across from Ehrenburg Palace. The new edifice was opened on 17 September 1840.

With the end of the monarchy in 1918, Karl Eduard transferred the property to the Landesstiftung Coburg in 1919. The foundation worked with the town of Coburg to operate the venue, renamed Landestheater. When Coburg became part of Bavaria in 1920, the Bavarian state took the place of the foundation.

The town continues to operate the theatre, but the Bavarian government remains the owner and carries most of the financial burden.

Conductors 
 Tebbe Harms Kleen (1979–1988)
 Dieter Gackstetter 
 Detlef Altenbeck 
 Bodo Busse (1. September 2010-)

General music directors 
 Albert Bing
 Alfred Ottokar Lorenz (1917–1920)
 Kurt Schröder
 Wilhelm Schönherr (1939–1945)
 Walter Stoschek (1945–1949)
 Helmut Pape
 Reinhard Petersen (1976–1980)
 Paul Theissen (1980–1988)
 Christian Fröhlich (1988–1995)
 Hiroshi Kodama (1996–2001)
 Alois Seidlmeier (seit 2002)
 Roland Kluttig (since 2010)

Further reading
 Harald Bachmann, Jürgen Erdmann (Hrsg.): 150 Jahre Coburger Landestheater. Landestheater, Coburg 1977, 
 Paul von Ebart: 100 Jahre Coburgische Theatergeschichte. 1827–1. Juni 1927. (= Coburger Heimatkunde und Heimatgeschichte; Tl 2, H. 3). Roßteuscher, Coburg 1927
 Jürgen Erdmann (Hrsg.): Ein Theater feiert. 175 Jahre Landestheater Coburg. Landestheater, Coburg 2002, 
 Andrea Heinz: Quantitative Spielplanforschung. Neue Möglichkeiten der Theatergeschichtsschreibung am Beispiel des Hoftheaters zu Coburg und Gotha (1827-1918). Winter, Heidelberg 1999,  (zugl. Dissertation, Universität Erlangen-Nürnberg 1996)
 Hanns-Peter Mederer: Die Hoftheater Meiningen und Coburg-Gotha 1831-1848. Ludwig Bechsteins Briefe an Friedrich Wilhelm von Kawaczynski. Rockstuhl Verlag Bad Langensalza 2007. 
 Peter Morsbach, Otto Titz: Stadt Coburg. Ensembles – Baudenkmäler – Archäologische Denkmäler. (= Denkmäler in Bayern; Band IV.48). Karl M. Lipp Verlag, München 2006,

References

External links 

 Official website

Theatres in Bavaria
Coburg
Buildings and structures in Coburg